Théo Arribagé (born 9 October 2000) is a French tennis player.

Arribagé has a career-high ATP singles ranking of 1053 achieved on 21 November 2022. He also has a career-high ATP doubles ranking of 147 achieved on 9 January 2023.

Arribagé made his ATP main draw debut at the 2023 Open Sud de France after entering the doubles main draw as alternates with Luca Sanchez.

References

External links

2000 births
Living people
French male tennis players
Sportspeople from Rennes